Permanent Shade of Blue is the third album by British band Roachford, released in 1994. The album was certified double-platinum in Australia, where it reached number 2 in the ARIA Charts.

Track listing
All tracks were written by Andrew Roachford.

Personnel

Band members
Andrew Roachford – vocals, keyboards, percussion, producer
Hawi Gondwe – guitar
Derrick Taylor – bass
Chris Taylor – drums

Additional musicians
Sagat Guiay – guitar on track 5
Gus Isidore – guitar on tracks 7 and 8
Frank Tontoh – drums on tracks 2 and 5
Pat Roache – drums on track 10
Chyna Gordon – backing vocals on track 6
Faye Simpson, Lain Gray, Lawrence – backing vocals on track 12
Jeff Beck – guitar on track 3

Production
Martin Phillips – producer on tracks 1 and 6
Gil Norton – producer on track 4
Mark O'Donohghue – engineer
Tim Palmer, Tony Phillips – mixing

Charts and certifications

Weekly charts

Year-end charts

Certifications

References

1994 albums
Roachford albums
Rock albums by British artists
Columbia Records albums
Albums produced by Tim Palmer
Albums produced by Gil Norton